Amarilys Alméstica Rivera (born February 12, 1981) is a hammer thrower from San Juan, Puerto Rico. She set her personal best throw (66.57 metres) on July 3, 2006, at a meet in Ottawa, Ontario, Canada.

Achievements

References

1981 births
Living people
Puerto Rican hammer throwers
Athletes (track and field) at the 2007 Pan American Games
Sportspeople from San Juan, Puerto Rico
Female hammer throwers
Puerto Rican female track and field athletes
Central American and Caribbean Games gold medalists for Puerto Rico
Competitors at the 2002 Central American and Caribbean Games
Competitors at the 2006 Central American and Caribbean Games
Central American and Caribbean Games medalists in athletics
Competitors at the 2003 Summer Universiade
Pan American Games competitors for Puerto Rico
21st-century American women